Four Days' Wonder is a 1936 American comedy mystery film directed by Sidney Salkow and starring Jeanne Dante, Kenneth Howell and Martha Sleeper.  Produced by Universal Pictures, the film is based on the 1933 novel "Four Days' Wonder" by  British writer A. A. Milne (New York, 1933). It was the first feature directed by Sidney Salkow.

Plot
A child is accused of murder.

Production
Filming started 5 August 1936. Star Jeanne Dante was on Broadway in Call It a Day.

References

External links
 
 
 
 

1936 films
1936 comedy films
1930s comedy mystery films
American comedy mystery films
1936 mystery films
1930s English-language films
Universal Pictures films
Films based on works by A. A. Milne
American black-and-white films
Films based on British novels
1930s American films